The 1956 DDR-Oberliga was the eighth season of the DDR-Oberliga, the first tier of league football in East Germany. Rather than in the traditional autumn-spring format the Oberliga played for six seasons from 1955 to 1960 in the calendar year format, modelled on the system used in the Soviet Union. From 1961–62 onwards the league returned to its traditional format.

The league was contested by fourteen teams. SC Wismut Karl-Marx-Stadt, incidentally based at Aue and not Karl-Marx-Stadt, won the championship, the club's first official one, having previously won the transition competition in 1955. On the strength of this title Wismut qualified for the 1957–58 European Cup where the club lost to Ajax Amsterdam in the first round.

Ernst Lindner of BSG Lokomotive Stendal was the league's top scorer with 18 goals.

Table									
The 1956 season saw two newly promoted clubs compare to the last official season, 1954–55, Fortschritt Weißenfels and BSG Lokomotive Stendal, with both already having played in the transition round in 1955. The FDGB-Pokal was won by second division DDR-Liga club Chemie Halle.

Results

References

Sources

External links
 Das Deutsche Fussball Archiv  Historic German league tables

1956 domestic association football leagues
1956
Ober
Ober
Ober